= Abduction of Czechoslovak citizens in Angola =

The abduction of Czechoslovak citizens in Angola took place on 12 March 1983 during the Angolan Civil War. The rebel UNITA movement captured 66 Czechoslovak citizens, including women and children, in the Angolan town of Alto Catumbela, who were sent there with the task of restoring the operation of the local paper mill. Czechoslovak experts were accompanied on the mission by their wives and children. The kidnapped Czechoslovak citizens were subsequently forced to march towards the UNITA base in the south of the country, 1,300 kilometers away. Slovak Jaroslav Navrátil died on 19 April 1983 at the age of 37. In June 1983, women and children were released, and later also seven sick men. A year later, on 23 June 1984, the remaining twenty men were released.

== In media ==
The film Angolský deník lékařky (directed by Vladimír Kavčiak) was filmed for Czechoslovak Television in 1984 at the Barrandov Film Studio based on the motives of this event. In addition to other authors, one of the direct participants, Lubomír Sazeček, described the activities of Czechoslovak workers and subsequent events in his books "Prisoners in Angola", from "Before UNITA came" to "After 25 years". It describes not only the events before the capture but also a look into the archive.

2009 Czech documentary Zajati v Angole (Captured in Angola) directed by Ján Mančuška chronicles events of the abduction.
